The Sahara International Film Festival, also known as FiSahara, is an annual event which takes place in the Sahrawi refugee camps, at the southwest corner of Algeria, near the border with Western Sahara. It is the only film festival in the world held in a refugee camp. The first festival was in large part organised by Peruvian film director Javier Corcuera.

For its first three years, FiSahara was held alternately in the Wilaya of Smara, the Wilaya of Ausserd, and the Wilaya of El Aaiún. Since 2007, the festival has been staged in the Wilaya of Dajla. The event is backed by the Polisario Front, but largely organised and funded by donors from Spain, the former colonial power in Western Sahara. The festival has attracted support from Spanish film celebrities, including Penélope Cruz, Javier Bardem, and Pedro Almodóvar. Musicians like Fermín Muguruza, Manu Chao, Macaco, Iván Ferreiro, El Chojin and Tomasito have performed in concerts during the festival.

FiSahara is billed as an initiative to bring film as an entertainment and cultural form to the thousands of Sahrawis who live in the Algerian desert. It also aims to provide cultural entertainment and educational opportunities to the refugees.

In 2010, a twinning agreement was signed between the FiSahara and the San Sebastian Human Rights Film Festival.

White Camel winners
The White Camel is the festival's top prize, awarded for the best film by election of the spectators. It consists of a white female camel, which is traditionally donated to the refugee family who hosted the actors or director of the winning film during the festival. The winners receive a trophy depicting a white camel and a desert rose.

Guest country
In some years, the festival has chosen a country to be a guest in the event. In such cases, films from the guest country are screened, and related events take place along with the other acts in the festival.

External links
Objective FiSahara Donostia.org – 24-page book about the FiSahara, with texts by Juan Carlos Izagirre, Eduardo Galeano, Paul Laverty, Javier Corcuera, Javier Bardem and others.
Sáhara Occidental: La Revolución del Cine o el Cine de la Revolución by David Bollero Real 
Prospect Magazine – Blogs Preview of 6th FISahara

References

2009 establishments in Algeria
Annual events in Algeria
Mass media in Western Sahara
Sahrawi culture
Film festivals in Algeria
Events in the Arab world
Spring (season) events in Algeria
Film festivals established in 2009